Hewa Khola-A Hydroelectric Project is a run-of-the-river hydroelectric power station with an installed capacity of 14.90 MW. This power station is located at Panchthar district of Nepal. The plant became fully operational on 2074-01-10 BS.

The plant is operated by Panchthar Power Company Pvt. Ltd., a private company of Nepal.

References

Hydroelectric power stations in Nepal
Gravity dams
Run-of-the-river power stations
2017 establishments in Nepal
Buildings and structures in Panchthar District